In mathematics, the affine Grassmannian of an algebraic group G over a field k is an ind-scheme—a colimit of finite-dimensional schemes—which can be thought of as a flag variety for the loop group G(k((t))) and which describes the representation theory of the Langlands dual group LG through what is known as the geometric Satake correspondence.

Definition of Gr via functor of points 

Through the Yoneda lemma, a scheme X over a field k is determined by its functor of points, which is the functor  which takes A to the set X(A) of A-points of X. We then say that this functor is representable by the scheme X. The affine Grassmannian is a functor from k-algebras to sets which is not itself representable, but which has a filtration by representable functors. As such, although it is not a scheme, it may be thought of as a union of schemes, and this is enough to profitably apply geometric methods to study it.

Let G be an algebraic group over k. The affine Grassmannian GrG is the functor that associates to a k-algebra A the set of isomorphism classes of pairs (E, φ), where E is a principal homogeneous space for G over Spec A and φ is an isomorphism, defined over Spec A((t)), of E with the trivial G-bundle G × Spec A((t)).  By the Beauville–Laszlo theorem, it is also possible to specify this data by fixing an algebraic curve X over k, a k-point x on X, and taking E to be a G-bundle on XA and φ a trivialization on (X − x)A. When G is a reductive group, GrG is in fact ind-projective, i.e., an inductive limit of projective schemes.

Definition as a coset space 

Let us denote by  the field of formal Laurent series over k, and by  the ring of formal power series over k.

References

Algebraic geometry